Fred Merkel (born September 28, 1962, in Stockton, California) is an American former professional motorcycle road racer and two-time Superbike World Champion.

Motorcycle racing career
In 1984 he teamed with Mike Baldwin to win the Suzuka 8 Hours endurance race. He is a three-time AMA Superbike Champion, winning in 1984/5 on the VF750 and 1986 on the VFR750F. He jointly holds the record for the most wins in a season with Mat Mladin.

In  the Superbike World Championship began, with Merkel entered on the RC30. He won the championship from Fabrizio Pirovano and Davide Tardozzi with two wins and three other podiums.

Merkel retired from racing at the end of the 1995 season after being injured in an accident at Firebird International Raceway in Chandler, Arizona. Merkel and his family moved to a ranch they owned in New Zealand.  He lives there with his wife Carla and son Travis, and as of the summer of 2009 welcomed newborn son Jhett.

He was inducted into the AMA Motorcycle Hall of Fame in 2001.

He was inducted into the Motorsports Hall of Fame of America in 2018.

Career statistics

Superbike World Championship

Races by year

Grand Prix motorcycle racing

Races by year
(key) (Races in bold indicate pole position, races in italics indicate fastest lap)

References

External links
 Bubba Shobert's (ex-Merkel) Factory Superbike
 Race winners at Brainerd

1962 births
Living people
Superbike World Championship riders
American people of German descent
American motorcycle racers
AMA Superbike Championship riders
Sportspeople from Stockton, California